Senator Hamilton may refer to:

Members of the United States Senate
Morgan C. Hamilton (1809–1893), U.S. Senator from Texas from 1870 to 1877
William Thomas Hamilton (1820–1888), U.S. Senator from Maryland from 1869 to 1875

United States state senate members
Bill Hamilton (West Virginia politician) (born 1950), West Virginia State Senate
Charles Mann Hamilton (1874–1942), New York State Senate
Clark Hamilton (1899–1980), Idaho State Senate
Cornelius S. Hamilton (1821–1867), Ohio State Senate
Darden Hamilton (born 1956), Arizona State Senate
Eva McCall Hamilton (1871–1948), Michigan State Senate
Isaac Miller Hamilton (1864–1952), Illinois State Senate
James A. Hamilton (1876–1950), New York State Senate
James E. Hamilton (born 1935), Oklahoma State Senate
James Hamilton Jr. (1786–1857), South Carolina State Senate
John Marshall Hamilton (1847–1905), Illinois State Senate
John Hamilton (congressman) (1754–1837), Pennsylvania State Senate
Jones S. Hamilton (1833–1907), Mississippi State Senate
Joseph B. Hamilton (1817–1902), Wisconsin State Senate
Milton H. Hamilton Jr. (1932–2008), Tennessee State Senate
Paul Hamilton (politician) (1762–1816), South Carolina State Senate
Robert S. Hamilton (1865–1940), Illinois State Senate
William J. Hamilton (1932–2019), New Jersey State Senate
Samuel Hambleton (politician) (1812–1886), Maryland State Senate